Kattathe Kilikkoodu is a 1983 Indian Malayalam-language drama film directed by Bharathan and written by T. Damodaran from a story by Nedumudi Venu. The film was produced by P. V. Gangadharan and stars Bharat Gopy, Mohanlal, Srividya, Revathi, and Anju. The music for the film was composed by Johnson. The film was a major commercial success.

The film won three Kerala State Film Awards, including Best Actor for Gopy. The film was remade in Tamil as Oonjaladum Uravugal. It marked the Malayalam debut of Revathi.

Plot
Prof. "Shakespeare" Krishna Pillai leads a very happy family life. His loving wife Sarada is a homemaker and they are blessed with three daughters and one son. Their neighbour is Indira Thampi, an unmarried woman who had a failed love affair during her college days. Her niece, Asha Thampi lives with her to attend college.

Asha's good friend Unnikrishnan, is the sports coach of her college team and is also a family friend of Prof. Krishna Pillai. Asha attends special classes taken by Prof. Krishna Pillai at his house. Unnikrishnan shares a liking of music with Sarada and this makes them vibe very well. Asha misinterprets this as a liking for each other. Unnikrishnan gets irritated because of Asha's immature behaviour.

Disheartened, Asha pretends to be in love with Prof. Krishna Pillai as revenge to Unnikrishnan. Professor was initially hesitant, but slowly starts liking her. He starts going out with her to night clubs and this worries Sarda. She informs about this to Indira and she in turn scolds Asha. In retaliation, Asha leaves from Indira's house but she has nowhere else to go. She takes help of the professor and he gets her admitted to YWCA hostel.

All the while, Asha makes it a point to avoid Unnikrishnan and he feels terrible and insulted because of that. While at YWCA hostel, he barges into her room when she informs through the matron that she doesn't want to see him. He asks her repeatedly about her relationship with the professor, but she doesn't give him any clear reply. Unnikrishnan tells Sarda about Asha and her immaturity.

The professor starts distancing from Sarda and this makes her confront him one day in front of their children. Furious, the professor leaves from home and takes a room in a hotel. He calls his family and talks to the children but hesitates to talk to Sarda. He is in a great dilemma whether to live with his family or Asha. Next day, he gets Asha to his hotel room and tries to get intimate with her. She gets uncomfortable at this and tries to pull her hands from his. At this moment Unnikrishnan arrives and confronts Asha, beats her repeatedly and she finally reveals the truth about her affair with the professor. She hugs Unnikrishnan in front of the professor, making him totally heartbroken.

Out of shame, the professor drinks heavily on the beach in his car. Unnikrishnan spots him and brings him to his home. After getting rid of a hangover, he happily reunites with his wife and kids.

Cast
 Bharath Gopi as Professor "Shakespeare" Krishna Pillai
 Mohanlal as Unnikrishnan
 Srividya as Sarada
 Revathi as Asha Thampi
 K. P. A. C. Lalitha as Indira Thampi
 Santhakumari
 Anju as Indu
Crew

Voice - artists

Soundtrack 
The film features songs composed by Johnson with lyrics by Kavalam Narayana Panicker.

Reception
Upon release, the film was well received in the theatres. The film is also noted for the performance of Srividya, often considered as one of the best performances in her career.

Awards
Kerala State Film Awards
Best Actor – Bharat Gopy
Best Female Playback Singer – S. Janaki
Best Art Director – Bharathan

Other awards
Kerala Film Critics Association Awards for Best Film
Film Fans Association Award for Best Film 
Rotary Award for Best Film

References

External links 

1983 films
1980s Malayalam-language films
Films directed by Bharathan
Films with screenplays by T. Damodaran
Malayalam films remade in other languages
Films scored by Johnson